Paint Drying is a 2016 British experimental protest film that was produced, directed and shot by Charlie Shackleton. It was made in protest against film censorship in the United Kingdom and the sometimes-prohibitive cost to independent filmmakers which the British Board of Film Classification's (BBFC) mandatory classification requirement imposes. The film consists of 607 minutes (10 hours and 7 minutes) of an unchanging view of white paint drying on a brick wall. Shackleton made the film to force the BBFC to watch all ten hours in order to give the film an age rating classification. Shackleton initially shot 14 hours' worth of footage of paint drying in 4K resolution and opened a Kickstarter campaign to pay the BBFC's per-minute rate for a film as long as possible. It raised £5,936 from 686 backers, paying for a film lasting 10 hours and 7 minutes. After reviewing the film, the BBFC rated it 'U' for 'Universal', indicating "no material likely to offend or harm".

Synopsis 
A non-narrative film, Paint Drying consists of 607 minutes (10 hours and 7 minutes) of an unchanging view of white paint drying on a brick wall. It is a single continuous shot. There is no audio, and it is uncertain whether the paint actually dries at the end of the film. It receives its title from the expression "like watching paint dry", which refers to something very tedious or boring.

Production

Background and conception 

Charlie Shackleton (known as Charlie Lyne until 2019) is a British independent filmmaker. He has written, directed and produced a number of independent films, such as his essay-style documentary films Beyond Clueless (2014)—his directorial debut—and Fear Itself (2015). The British Board of Film Classification (BBFC) is the authority responsible for the national classification and censorship of films exhibited at cinemas and video works released on physical media within the United Kingdom. While the BBFC's regulatory powers do not extend to the Internet, all filmmakers wishing to release a film in British cinemas are required to receive a rating from the BBFC or exemption from the local authority. In 2015, it cost £101.50 plus £7.09 per minute of runtime to have a film reviewed by the BBFC.

Paint Drying is a protest against both film censorship in the UK, and the unfair cost to independent filmmakers imposed by the BBFC's mandatory classification requirement. According to Shackleton, "this project [Paint Drying] is the culmination of a decade spent aimlessly railing against the BBFC – a decade that began when I was 13 years old". Shackleton states that his distaste for the BBFC began when he was reading the trivia section on IMDb for the 1999 film Fight Club, and saw that the version he had seen was censored by the BBFC by having six seconds cut in order to "reduce the sense of sadistic pleasure in inflicting violence". Shackleton was dismayed, stating "if we censor art on the basis that someone somewhere might be hurt by it, we'll be left with no art at all. Should the White Album be banned because Charlie Manson used 'Helter Skelter' to justify murder?"

In protest against the BBFC's per-minute rate for film classifications, Shackleton stated that the average cost of an age classification for independent filmmakers could exceed £1,000, which would prove to be a heavy financial burden on most independent filmmakers. According to Shackleton, the BBFC certificate for his debut self-distributed film, Beyond Clueless, cost £867.60, which was roughly fifty per cent of its distribution budget. Shackleton stated that he knew of several planned cinematic releases from independent filmmakers that had to be abandoned because the cost was too high, which he added was "terrible for British film culture". He conceived the idea to make a film about paint drying while at a filmmaker's event at the BBFC in 2015. He had expected to see conflict between the BBFC examiners and the visiting filmmakers, but was surprised that there was no such altercation; Shackleton added that, on the contrary, many of the attending filmmakers seemed to be supportive of the BBFC. He also disapproved of the examiners who were discussing the censorship of certain films and the rationale behind such action.

Filming, editing and Kickstarter campaign 

Shackleton initially shot 14 hours' worth of footage of white paint drying in 4K resolution. He chose the colour white because of its "certain Tom Sawyer charm". The location of the wall that was painted has not been disclosed. On 16 November 2015, Shackleton opened a Kickstarter campaign to increase the film's length by as much as possible. The funds raised would be put towards the cost of the age classification, the final length of the film being resolute with how much money was raised from the campaign. It had raised £961—worth 2 hours and 1 minute of footage—by 18 November, and an individual unaffiliated with the campaign created a website that tracked in real time how long Paint Drying would be. By 20 November, the film had raised £3,147, which equated to more than seven hours of footage. By 23 November, Paint Drying hit £4,000. Shackleton stated that he would shoot more footage if the Kickstarter campaign raised more than £6,057 (meaning 14 hours' worth of footage), although ultimately this did not happen.

Shackleton told The Daily Telegraph that he hoped that crowdfunding a BBFC classification for the film would demonstrate how many people are concerned about film censorship in the UK, adding that the prospect of making the BBFC examiners watch paint dry was humorous. Shackleton acknowledged that Paint Drying would likely not have a large impact on film censorship within the UK, but nevertheless hoped that it would encourage people to debate the practices of the BBFC. He further stated that people accepted the BBFC solely because of its age, claiming that if a similar organisation were to be founded today in order to censor literature or music, there would be public outrage. The Kickstarter campaign ended on 31 December 2015, having raised £5,936 from 686 backers—equating to 731 minutes (12 hours and 11 minutes) of footage, which was shortened to 10 hours and 7 minutes after Kickstarter's fees and value-added tax.

The campaign also received donations from people outside of the UK, which surprised Shackleton as he thought that non-British individuals would be confused about the BBFC's authority. He concluded that censorship was unfortunately a "pretty universal concept". Shackleton also stated that filmmakers from around the world, particularly Australia and India, were supportive of Paint Drying. Despite suggestions from backers for Shackleton to secretly insert a penis into a single frame of Paint Drying, he ultimately decided against it as he believed it would have detracted from the point of the film.

Release

Classification 
The Digital Cinema Package (DCP) that Shackleton submitted to the BBFC for classification was 310 gigabytes in size. Due to the length of the film, BBFC examiners split their watch time into two sessions over two consecutive days, the majority being viewed on 25 January. To coincide with the examination, Shackleton held an 'Ask Me Anything' (AMA) question and answer session on the subreddit r/IAmA, during which he stated that he did not himself watch the film in its entirety. Shackleton's post received hundreds of comments within a day and became the most popular post on the subreddit. On 26 January, upon reviewing the film, the BBFC rated it 'U' for 'Universal,' indicating "no material likely to offend or harm". After receiving a digital copy of the certificate, Shackleton tweeted that it was "£5,936 well spent". In response to the protest, the BBFC stated in a press release that it would classify the film as it would any other submission. Paint Drying is not the longest film to have been rated by the BBFC—the French film Out 1 (1971) is 773 minutes (12 hours, 55 minutes) long, and was classified by the BBFC in 2015. It was rated 15 for "very strong language".

Reception 

Although Shackleton had no plans for a wide theatrical release, he stated on 25 January 2016 that he was in talks with a cinema in London about possibly showing the film. Shackleton planned for it to be followed by a public debate regarding film censorship. He later added that "it would take some working out, [in terms of] how to show it. I can't imagine that many people would make it through the entire duration", stating that it would have to be shown in a setting that could allow for people to walk in and out of the theatre. The A.V. Club said that a "14-hour director's cut is presumably forthcoming", while Gizmodo AU stated that uploading the film onto YouTube would be an ideal place for its "cinematic brilliance" to be permanently available for anyone to view. British magazine Dazed said that if Shackleton had allowed Paint Drying to be shown in cinemas, it would have been a great way to prank one's significant other on Valentine's Day.

Post-release 
On 1 March 2016, Paint Drying was the subject of a video essay by the French series , broadcast by Arte. In it, presenter Luc Lagier positively compares the film to Wavelength (1967), a structural film that consists of a gradually zooming-in shot of a room. In the September 2016 issue of Alive, D.P. Sabharwal called the film "a novel and innovative protest". Shackleton reflected on Paint Drying in an article he wrote for Vice in April 2017, in which he stated that the BBFC remained unchanged since his protest, and "continues to ban films outright". In an April 2017 opinion piece by National Post praising Shackleton's work, Calum Marsh declared Paint Drying a comedy and praised Shackleton's dedication to creating the film. Marsh stated that he was unsure about its merit as a film, but stated that as a comedy, "it's very, very good". On 15 October 2018, Paint Drying was featured in an episode of series P of the British panel show QI. In 2022, academic Arina Pismenny referred to Paint Drying as an example of art that was objectively boring yet interesting given its context.

See also 
 List of longest films
 Paracinema
 Satire film

Notes

References

Citations

Bibliography

Further reading

External links 

 

2010s British films
2010s satirical films
2016 films
2016 documentary films
British avant-garde and experimental films
British Board of Film Classification
British documentary films
British independent films
British satirical films
British silent feature films
Kickstarter-funded documentaries
Non-narrative films
One-shot films
Protests in the United Kingdom
Works about painting
Films directed by Charlie Shackleton